P.K. Chathan Master (1920—1988) was a Communist leader and the first Minister for Local Self Government and Dalits Welfare of the State of Kerala.

Political life 

P. K. Chathan Master was born as the son of Shri. Kavalan in 1920 and was the first Scheduled Caste minister of Kerala. He was the Minister for Local Self Government and Harijan Welfare of the State of Kerala in the 1957 EMS government.

Kerala Pulaya Maha Sabha, KPMS was established in 1970 under the leadership of P. K. Chathan Master. From 1974 to 1976 he served as the Chairman of the Committee on the Welfare of Scheduled Castes and Scheduled Tribes. During a long span of public life he had also served as the Vice Chairman of the Kerala Khadi and Village Industries Board and President of the Kerala Pulayar Mahasabha.

The Kuttamkulam struggle (Vazzhinadakkal Samaram) in 1946 was started as a protest  against untouchability into the premises of the Kudalmanikyam temple in  Irinjalakuda. The caste organizations like S N D P, Samastha Cochin  Pulaya Mahasabha, the political parties like  Kochi rajya prajamandalam,  CPI and Beedi  workers  organizations protested  against  this  injustice.

The people united  under the leadership of  P. K. Kumaran Master, Saratha  Kumaran, K .V. Unni and P. K. Chathan Master. Finally the untouchables' classes got the right to walk  along  the  Kuttamkulam  road!

References
 http://niyamasabha.org/codes/mem_1_5.htm
http://niyamasabha.org/codes/mem_1_4.htm

1988 deaths
1920 births
Maharaja's College, Ernakulam alumni
Communist Party of India politicians from Kerala